Bruce Graham Thom  is an Australian geoscientist and educator. He is a founding member of the Wentworth Group of Concerned Scientists, Emeritus Professor at the University of Sydney in Australia and founding President of the Australian Coastal Society. Educated at The Scots College in Bellevue Hill, Sydney, Australia  and the University of Sydney, where he served as Professor of Geography and Pro-Vice Chancellor (Research). He is also former Vice Chancellor of the University of New England and former Chair of the Australian State of the Environment Committee. Professor Thom has written widely in the areas of physical geography, coastal management, coastal policy, coastal geology, and geomorphology. He was made a member of the Order of Australia in 2010.

List of honours
Emeritus Professor, University of Sydney
Former Chair, Coasts and Climate Change Council
Former President, The Australian Coastal Society
Former Chair, Australian State of the Environment Committee
Former Chair, Current Member, NSW Coastal Council
Former Vice Chancellor, University of New England
Former Pro-Vice Chancellor, University of Sydney
Honorary life member of Surfrider Foundation Australia
Honorary life member of NSW Geographical Society
Honorary member of the Sydney Coastal Councils Group
Fellow, Academy of Technological Science and Engineering (FTSE)
Fellow, Institute of Australian Geographers (FIAG)
Honorary doctorate, University of Wollongong

References

External links
 Australian Coastal Society
 Wentworth Group of Concerned Scientists
 Australia State of the Environment 2001 report
 We must adapt for climate change now

Living people
Australian environmentalists
1939 births
Academic staff of the University of Sydney
Australian geomorphologists
Members of the Order of Australia
Fellows of the Australian Academy of Technological Sciences and Engineering